Badal is a village in the Charkhi Dadri district of the Indian state of Haryana. , the village had 372 households with a total population of 1,903 of which 1,043 were male and 860 female.

References

Villages in Charkhi Dadri district